Nine is a Swedish Hardcore punk band, formed in Linköping in 1994. The band has released five albums and two EPs.

Band members
 Johan Lindqvist – lead vocals
 Robert Karlsson – bass
 Karl Torstensson – drums
 Oskar Ekman – guitar

Former members
 Benjamin Vallé – guitar/backing vocals
 Tor Castensson – drums
 Oskar Eriksson – bass
 Gustav Björnsson – bass
 Johan Something Something – guitar
 Erik Nordstedt – guitar

Discography
 To the Bottom [EP] (1995)
 Listen (1997)
 Kissed By the Misanthrope (1998)
 Nine/Like Peter at Home [split album] (2000)
 Lights Out (2001)
 Killing Angels (2003)
 Death Is Glorious [EP] (2006)
 Its Your Funeral (2007)

Videography
 "Time Has Come" (2001)
 "Euthanasia" (2004)
 "Anxiety Report" (2004)
 "Inferno" (2004)
 "Nothing Left for the Vultures" (2007)
 "No Air Supply" (2008)

References

External links
 
 
 

Swedish musical groups